May (Maay) is a rural locality (a selo), one of two settlements, in addition to Berdigestyakh, in Berdigestyakhsky Rural Okrug of Gorny District in the Sakha Republic, Russia. Its population as of the 2010 Census was 10, of whom 5 were male and 5 female, down from 13 as recorded during the 2002 Census.

References

Notes

Sources
Official website of the Sakha Republic. Registry of the Administrative-Territorial Divisions of the Sakha Republic. Gorny District. 

Rural localities in Gorny District